Coleophora sobrinella is a moth of the family Coleophoridae. It is found in Turkey.

References

sobrinella
Endemic fauna of Turkey
Moths described in 1944
Moths of Asia